Blažo Rajović (Cyrillic: Блaжo Pajoвић, born 26 March 1986 in Titograd, current Podgorica) is a Montenegrin football player. The defender plays for Montenegrin side Grbalj.

Club career
A much-travelled central defender, he had played mostly with the Montenegrin historically most successful club, FK Budućnost Podgorica.

Honours
 Montenegrin First League:
 Winners (1): 2007-08

External links

Profile - FSHF

1986 births
Living people
Footballers from Podgorica
Association football central defenders
Serbia and Montenegro footballers
Montenegrin footballers
Montenegro under-21 international footballers
OFK Titograd players
FK Dečić players
FK Kom players
FK Budućnost Podgorica players
KF Vllaznia Shkodër players
Flamurtari Vlorë players
FK Zeta players
Naxxar Lions F.C. players
FK Mornar players
OFK Petrovac players
KF Laçi players
KF Besa players
FK Lovćen players
Second League of Serbia and Montenegro players
First League of Serbia and Montenegro players
Kategoria Superiore players
Montenegrin First League players
Maltese Premier League players
Football Superleague of Kosovo players
Montenegrin expatriate footballers
Expatriate footballers in Albania
Montenegrin expatriate sportspeople in Albania
Expatriate footballers in Malta
Montenegrin expatriate sportspeople in Malta
Expatriate footballers in Kosovo
Montenegrin expatriate sportspeople in Kosovo
Montenegrin Second League players